Sonata for Solo Violin may refer to:

 Sonatas and partitas for solo violin (Bach)
 Sonata for Solo Violin (Bartók)
 Sonata for Solo Violin (Prokofiev)
 Six Sonatas for solo violin (Ysaÿe)